The Pokataroo railway line is a railway line in New South Wales, Australia. It branches from the Walgett line at Burren Junction, and opened in 1906. There are signs of the line being constructed across the Barwon River all the way to Collarenebri, New South Wales

The line is closed beyond Merrywinebone. Passenger services were withdrawn in 1974. The line is primarily used for grain haulage with large grain loading facilities located at Merrywinebone and Rowena.

Pokataroo station precinct features a turning triangle used to reverse the direction of a locomotive prior to commencing a return journey.

See also
Rail transport in New South Wales
Rail rollingstock in New South Wales

References

Further reading 
Flat Lands and Myall – The Pokataroo Branch Milne, Rod Australian Railway Historical Society Bulletin, April, 1960 pp79–87

Regional railway lines in New South Wales
Standard gauge railways in Australia
Railway lines opened in 1906
1906 establishments in Australia